Ingmarsö is an island located in the Stockholm archipelago in Sweden.

References

Islands of Österåker Municipality
Islands of the Stockholm archipelago